Plagiostropha is a genus of sea snails, marine gastropod mollusks in the family Drilliidae.

Species
Species within the genus Plagiostropha include:
 Plagiostropha alboscala Chino & Stahlschmidt, 2020
 Plagiostropha bicolor Chino & Stahlschmidt, 2010
 Plagiostropha brevifusca Chino & Stahlschmidt, 2020
 Plagiostropha caledoniensis (Wells, 1995)
 Plagiostropha chrysotincta Chino & Stahlschmidt, 2020
 Plagiostropha costata (Wells, 1995)
 Plagiostropha decapitata Chino & Stahlschmidt, 2020
 Plagiostropha flexus (Shuto, 1983)
 Plagiostropha hexagona (Wells, 1995)
 Plagiostropha opalus (Reeve, 1845) 
 Plagiostropha quintuplex Melvill, 1927 
 Plagiostropha roseopinna Chino & Stahlschmidt, 2010
 Plagiostropha rubrifaba Chino & Stahlschmidt, 2010
 Plagiostropha sinecosta Wells, 1991
 Plagiostropha vertigomaeniana Chino & Stahlschmidt, 2010
Species brought into synonymy
 Plagiostropha gibberula (Hervier, 1896): synonym of Drillia gibberulus (Hervier, 1896) 
 Plagiostropha turrita Wells, 1995: synonym of Splendrillia turrita <small>(Wells, 1995)</small

References

 Melvill, J.C. 1927. Descriptions of eight new species of the family Turridae and of a new species of Mitra. Proceedings of the Malacological Society of London 17: 149-155, pl. 12

External links
 Wells, F.E. 1995. A revision of the drilliid genera Splandrillia and Plagiostropha (Gastropoda: Conoidea) from New Caledonia, with additional records from other areas. In, . Résultats des Campagnes MUSORSTOM. Mémoires de Muséum National d'Histoire Naturelle 167: 1-654
 Bouchet, P.; Kantor, Y. I.; Sysoev, A.; Puillandre, N. (2011). A new operational classification of the Conoidea (Gastropoda). Journal of Molluscan Studies. 77(3): 273-308

 
Gastropod genera